Stanley Thomas Meads (born 12 July 1938) is a New Zealand former rugby union player and brother of Colin Meads. He played as a lock, number eight and flanker, and scored four tries for New Zealand in 30 games (15 tests). He played for King Country between 1957 and 1966, when he abruptly announced his retirement to concentrate on his sheep farm near Te Kuiti.

References

1938 births
New Zealand international rugby union players
New Zealand rugby union players
Living people
People from Arapuni
King Country rugby union players
Rugby union locks
Rugby union players from Waikato